Jack Myers  may refer to:

Jack Myers (biologist) (1913–2006), American molecular biologist and writer of popular science
Jack Myers (American football) (1924–2020), professional American football player
Jack Elliott Myers (1941–2009), former Texas Poet Laureate

See also
John Myers (disambiguation)